Mary Dawson may refer to:

 Mary R. Dawson, American paleontologist
 Mary Dawson (civil servant), Canadian civil servant
 Mary Cardwell Dawson (1894–1962), African-American musician and teacher
 Mary Elizabeth Dawson (1833–1924), New Zealand servant, farmer, environmentalist and nurse
 Mary Dawson, Countess of Dartrey (1854–1939), British peer
 Mary Elizabeth Dawson (given name), (1890–1982), American, née Elizabeth Buzby known as Mademoiselle Fifi